Gaston Brière (1 December 1871, 11th arrondissement of Paris – 22 June 1962, 16th arrondissement of Paris) was a French art historian and head curator of France's national museums. He specialised in 17th and 18th century French painting and taught a noted course at the École du Louvre from 1912 to 1938. In 1903 he joined the staff of the Palace de Versailles, becoming its chief curator from 1932 to 1938.

References

External links
 

1871 births
1962 deaths
French art historians
French curators
French male non-fiction writers